Prajakt Prasadrao Tanpure (born 13 September 1976) is an Indian politician from the state of Maharashtra,  the he is Ex Minister of state of Maharashtra for Urban Development, Energy, Higher and Technical Education, Tribal Development, Disaster Management, Relief and Rehabilitation. Prajakt Tanpure is elected as member of the 14th Maharashtra Legislative Assembly in Vidhan Sabha Elections 2019. He represents the Rahuri-Nagar- Pathardi constituency.

References

1976 births
Living people
Maharashtra MLAs 2019–2024
Nationalist Congress Party politicians
Nationalist Congress Party politicians from Maharashtra